Rafael Morales may refer to:

 Rafael Morales (poet) (1919–2005), Spanish poet
 Rafael Morales (footballer) (born 1988), Guatemalan footballer
 Rafael Morales (gymnast), Puerto Rican gymnast
 Rafael Morales (bishop), bishop of the Episcopal Diocese of Puerto Rico